Jan Jönsson (born 27 April 1944) is a Swedish equestrian. He was born in Motala. He won a bronze medal in individual eventing at the 1972 Summer Olympics in Munich. He also competed at the 1984 Summer Olympics in Los Angeles.

His daughter-in-law is the Finnish rider Piia Pantsu.

References

External links

1944 births
Living people
People from Motala Municipality
Swedish male equestrians
Olympic bronze medalists for Sweden
Equestrians at the 1972 Summer Olympics
Equestrians at the 1984 Summer Olympics
Olympic medalists in equestrian
Medalists at the 1972 Summer Olympics
Sportspeople from Östergötland County